Willie Gary (born November 1, 1978), is an American football defensive back, who played in the National Football League for the St. Louis Rams, in NFL Europa for the Scottish Claymores, and in the Arena Football League for Georgia Force. He was a member of the 2001 Rams team, who lost Super Bowl XXXVI to the New England Patriots, in 2002.

On February 15, 2008, he filed a $100 million lawsuit in a New Orleans, Louisiana United States district court against the Patriots, Belichick, and Patriots owner Robert Kraft seeking compensation for the Rams' Super Bowl XXXVI loss in light of the allegations. The lawsuit was withdrawn on March 10, 2008, after Gary's lawyers called securing testimony from Walsh regarding his possible knowledge of the allegation an "exercise in futility."

Gary has since begun a career in coaching, with stops at both North Gwinnett High School and Shiloh High School in his native Georgia. Along with 2 years as defensive coordinator for the Georgia Force of the Arena Football League, Gary was also the defensive coordinator and interim head coach at Clark Atlanta University. He is currently the head coach at Berkmar High School in Lilburn, GA, and also the defensive coordinator for the Atlanta Havoc of the American Arena League.

External links 
Scottish Claymores profile
Georgia Force profile

References

External links
Just Sports Stats

1978 births
Living people
People from Valdosta, Georgia
American football defensive backs
Kentucky Wildcats football players
St. Louis Rams players
Scottish Claymores players
Georgia Force players